Banksia Park is a north-eastern suburb located 20 km from the city centre of Adelaide, South Australia, within the City of Tea Tree Gully.

History
Banksia Park was originally named Steventon by John Stevens, the first purchaser of this block of land, however the name was later changed to Banksia Park due to the abundance of banksia trees located within the area.

Steventon Post Office opened around January 1859 and was renamed Tea Tree Gully in 1872. A Banksia Park office has never existed.

Residents
In 2001, Banksia Park had a population of 3,455 with 48% being in the age group of 25–54 years. By 2006, the population dropped to 3,398 and by 2011, it has dropped again to 3,238. However, at the 2016 Australian Census, the population was recorded as having increased to 3,289.

References

Suburbs of Adelaide